The 1924 legislative election was held on 11 and 25 May 1924.

It resulted in a victory for the left-wing Cartel des Gauches, an alliance of Radicals and Socialists, which governed until July 1926 under the premierships of Édouard Herriot, Paul Painlevé and Aristide Briand.

Results

Popular Vote

|-
!style="background-color:#E9E9E9" align=left valign=top colspan="2"|Alliance
!style="background-color:#E9E9E9" align=right|Votes
!style="background-color:#E9E9E9" align=right|%
!style="background-color:#E9E9E9" align=left valign=top colspan="2"|Party
!style="background-color:#E9E9E9" align=right|Abbr.
!style="background-color:#E9E9E9" align=right|Votes
!style="background-color:#E9E9E9" align=right|%
|-
|style="background-color:#E75480" rowspan="2"|  
|align=left rowspan="2"|Cartel des Gauches
|rowspan="2"| 3,426,581
|rowspan="2"| 38.07
|style="background-color:#E75480"|
|align=left| French Section of the Workers' International (Section française de l'Internationale ouvrière)
|align=right| SFIO
|align=right|1,814,000
|align=right|20.10
|-
|style="background-color:#FFBF00"|
|align=left| Republican, Radical and Radical-Socialist Party (Parti républicain, radical et radical-socialiste) and Republican-Socialist Party (Parti républicain-socialiste)
|align=right|PRRRS
|align=right|1,612,581
|align=right|17.86
|-
|style="background-color:#0000C8"|
|colspan=5 align=left| Republican Federation (Fédération républicaine)
|align=right|FR
|align=right|3,190,831
|align=right|35.35
|-
|style="background-color:#0080FF"|
|colspan=5 align=left| Democratic, Republican, and Social Party (Parti républicain démocratique et social) and Independent Radicals (Radicaux indépendents)
|align=right|PRDS
|align=right|1,058,293
|align=right|11.72
|-
|style="background-color:#FF0000"|
|colspan=5 align=left| French Communist Party (Parti communiste français)
|align=right|PCF
|align=right|885,993
|align=right|9.82
|-
|style="background-color:#00008B"|
|colspan=5 align=left| Independents (Indépendents)
|align=right|Ind
|align=right|375,806
|align=right|4.16
|-
|style="background-color:gray"|
|colspan=5 align=left| Other parties
|align=right|Div
|align=right|89,333
|align=right|0.99
|-
|align=left colspan=7|Total
|align=right| 
|align=right|100
|-
|colspan=9 align=left|Abstention: 19.55%
|}

Parliamentary Groups

References and notes
Popular Vote on France-politique.fr
Parliamentary Groups on France-politique.fr

1924
1924 elections in France